Events from the year 1885 in Denmark.

Incumbents
 Monarch – Christian IX
 Prime minister – J. B. S. Estrup

Events

Undated

Sports
 13 May  AaB Fodbold is founded.

Births
 17 April – Karen Blixen (died 1972)
 10 July – Kai Holm, actor (born 1896)
 7 October – Niels Bohr, (born 1885)

Deaths
 21 January – Jens Peter Trap, royal secretary, topographical writer and publisher (born 1810)

References

 
1880s in Denmark
Denmark
Years of the 19th century in Denmark